The Pakistan women's national field hockey team represents Pakistan in international field hockey competitions, and is governed by the Pakistan Hockey Federation (PHF). The first women's national championships were held in Lahore in 1976. It took another seven years (1983) before the national team played two international matches, against Ireland at Karachi and Lahore.

History

2000s
In 2016, the team qualified for its first ever semi-final place at the Asian Hockey Federation (AHF) Cup held in Bangkok, Thailand. In 2017, the team participated in three nation, Asian Challenge Cup held in Brunei where it finished runner-up to Hong Kong. In January 2018, it participated in the Asian Games qualifiers held in Bangkok, Thailand.

World Ranking

 January 2018: 58
 November 2020: 62

Tournament record

AHF Cup
 2003 – 4th place
 2012 – 6th place
 2016 – 4th place

Members

Current as of 1 November 2020

References

External links
Official website

Women's national team
Asian women's national field hockey teams
Field hockey
Women's sport in Pakistan